Klaus-Michael Körner (27 November 1952 – 16 May 2022) was a German politician. A member of the Social Democratic Party of Germany, he served in the Landtag of Mecklenburg-Vorpommern from 1998 to 2011. He died on 16 May 2022 at the age of 69.

References

1952 births
2022 deaths
People from Cottbus
People from Bezirk Cottbus
Social Democratic Party of Germany politicians
Members of the Landtag of Mecklenburg-Western Pomerania
20th-century German politicians
21st-century German politicians
University of Rostock alumni